The Battle of Balakliia was the first battle of the Ukrainian Kharkiv counteroffensive that began on September 6, 2022.

Background 
During the early days of the 2022 Russian invasion of Ukraine, Russian forces captured much of eastern Kharkiv Oblast, including the towns of Kupiansk, Shevchenkove, and Balakliia. Balakliia itself was captured on March 3, 2022, without much of a fight. From March to early May, most of the fighting in Kharkiv Oblast was concentrated in the cities of Kharkiv and Izium.

In early April, Russian forces captured Izium, and Ukrainian forces successfully defended Kharkiv by early May. After that, the frontline began to stagnate as Russia and Ukraine focused their efforts on the cities of Sievierodonetsk, Lysychansk and the wider Donbas region.

Throughout July and August 2022, Ukrainian and Russian media both amplified claims of a Ukrainian counteroffensive in Kherson Oblast, which finally culminated on August 29, 2022. The counteroffensive saw slow progress, with Ukrainian forces suffering heavy losses and facing a stiff Russian resistance. However, on September 6, Ukrainian forces launched a surprise counteroffensive in eastern Kharkiv oblast, with fighting for Balakliia beginning on the first day.

Battle 
On September 6, Ukrainian forces launched an offensive towards Balakliia, after having concentrated lots of forces near the area. On the first day, they liberated , a suburb northwest of Balakliia. Russian forces stationed in Balakliia blew up bridges to slow the Ukrainian advance from Verbivka, although Ukrainian forces went around the town instead to besiege it. Some Ukrainian forces stayed near Balakliia, fighting Russian forces in the center of the city while another group went north towards Volokhiv Yar.

By September 7, Balakliia was under siege, with fighting taking place in the eastern and central parts of the city. Fighting ended on September 8, with Ukrainian forces liberating all of Balakliia.

Aftermath 

During the days after the battle, Ukrainian forces liberated Kupiansk on September 9, Izium on September 10, and Velykyi Burluk and Vovchansk on September 12. The counteroffensive stalled after September 12, as news teams, Ukrposhta, and other organizations were let into eastern Kharkiv oblast.

On September 14, Ukrainian police officers found evidence of a torture chamber that housed 40 civilians in the basement of the Balakliia police station. The locals that remained in the city claimed that unlike other areas under Russian occupation like Bucha and Irpin, Russian occupation forces were generally much more tame in their treatment of civilians.

See also

 2022 Ukrainian Kharkiv counteroffensive
 Russian occupation of Kharkiv Oblast
 Battle of Kharkiv (2022)

References

September 2022 events in Ukraine
History of Kharkiv Oblast
Balakliia
Eastern Ukraine offensive